The ninth season of the Brazilian competitive reality television series MasterChef  premiered on May 17, 2022 at 10:45 p.m. on Band.

Ana Paula Padrão returned as the host, while Érick Jacquin, Helena Rizzo, Henrique Fogaça returned as judges.

The grand prize is R$300.000, a car by Mitsubishi, a scholarship on Le Cordon Bleu, 40 kitchen products from  Britânia, a complete home bar and a mixology course from Johnnie Walker and the MasterChef trophy.

Designer Lays Fernandes won the competition over civil engineering Fernanda Oliveira on September 6, 2022.

Contestants

Top 16

Elimination table

Key

Special Participations
Episode 5: Lauana Prado and Tayrone

Episode 6: Chef Timóteo Domingos

Episode 7: Chef Kelly Grimaldi and Chef Efrem Cutler 

Episode 8: Valesca Popozuda

Episode 12: Chef Pía Leon

Episode 14: Ronaro Soares, Chef Luana Sabino and Chef Eduardo Ortiz

Episode 15: Andressa Alves, Cristiane, Edmilson, Chef Pablo Peralta and Alê Costa

Episode 16: Dayse Paparoto,  Pablo Oazen,  Rafael Gomes

Ratings and reception

Brazilian ratings

All numbers are in points and provided by Kantar Ibope Media.

References

External links
 MasterChef on Band

2022 Brazilian television seasons
MasterChef (Brazilian TV series)